Žepče is a town and municipality located in Zenica-Doboj Canton of the Federation of Bosnia and Herzegovina, an entity of Bosnia and Herzegovina. It is situated in central Bosnia and Herzegovina, between Doboj and Zenica. As of 2013, it has a population of 30,219 inhabitants.

The river Bosna flows through this city. Near  within the town, there are 14 mineral water springs. Žepče is within the vicinity of the Lasva valley and thus is surrounded by mountains.

History
The town was first mentioned in 1458 in a charter issued by the Bosnian king Stjepan Tomašević, "... Pissanna Žepču va ljetu 1458. oktombrija 14. dan." (Written in Žepče in the year 1458. 14.day of October)

The city would see combat during the Bosnian War, as HVO forces would launch an operation against ARBiH over complete control of the city on the 24th of June, 1993. After the Dayton Agreement in 1995, the city would end up becoming a part of the Federation of Bosnia and Herzegovina, as part of the Zenica-Doboj Canton.

Demographics
In 2001 the following Croat villages from the municipalities of Maglaj and Zavidovići merged with the municipality of Žepče to form one entity with Croat majority: Adže, Pire, Ponijevo, Matina, Ljubatovići, Grabovica, Čustovo Brdo, Komšići, Radunice, Globarica, Brankovići, Donji Lug, Gornji Lug, Vrbica, Debelo Brdo, Osova, Vinište and Gornja Lovnica.

Population

Ethnic composition

Town

Sport
The town is home to local football club NK Žepče.

Notable people
Ivica Marić, basketball player
Abdulvehab Ilhamija, poet and prose writer
Emir Preldžić, basketball player
Nedžad Ibrišimović, writer

Gallery

References

External links 
Official municipality site
Žepče Info - žepački internet portal

 
Populated places in Žepče